"Sparks Fly" is a song written and recorded by American singer-songwriter Taylor Swift for her third studio album Speak Now (2010). Swift had written the song before she released her self-titled debut album in 2006, but only included it on her third album after she received fan requests to release the song. Produced by Swift and Nathan Chapman, "Sparks Fly" is an uptempo track combining country, pop rock, and arena rock with a production incorporating dynamic electric guitars and subtle fiddles. The lyrics are about a temptation to resist a dangerous love affair.

The song was released to US country radio on July 18, 2011, by Big Machine Records, as the fifth single from Speak Now. A music video featuring footage of the Speak Now World Tour was released on August 10, 2011, accompanied by a limited-edition CD single released on Swift's official website. In contemporary reviews, most music critics praised the uptempo production, but some deemed the track forgettable. The single won a Teen Choice Award for Choice Music – Country Song.

Following the release of Speak Now, "Sparks Fly" debuted at number 17 on the US Billboard Hot 100 and at number 28 on the Canadian Hot 100. After its single release, it peaked at number one on Billboard's Hot Country Songs chart and was certified platinum by the Recording Industry Association of America (RIAA). Swift included the song on the set lists of the Speak Now World Tour (2011–2012) and the Red Tour (2013–2014), and performed it on select dates of the 1989 World Tour (2015) and her Reputation Stadium Tour (2018).

Background and release 
American singer-songwriter Taylor Swift began work on her third studio album, Speak Now (2010), two years prior to its release. A track on the album, "Sparks Fly", was written by Swift when she was sixteen years old, before she released her self-titled debut album in 2006. She performed the song live during a few bar shows, and a recorded live performance of the song during one of her concerts made its way onto the internet in 2007. The song became a favorite among Swift's fans, and after Swift received fan request to include "Sparks Fly" on her third album at the 2010 CMA Music Festival, she decided to rework the song and include it on Speak Now. The album version includes some changes to the lyrics and arrangement.

"Sparks Fly" was sent to US country radio on July 18, 2011, by Big Machine Records; it was the fifth single from Speak Now. An exclusive package was released to Swift's official store including a "Speak Now" necklace and an individually numbered "Sparks Fly" CD single. The single was later included in another package that was exclusive to Swift's official store. The package included the Target-exclusive deluxe edition of Speak Now, a pair of headphones, and one of the three CD singles for "Sparks Fly", "The Story of Us", or "Mean". The song was featured on a promotional trailer for the CW show, Hart of Dixie.

Music and lyrics 

"Sparks Fly" was written by Swift, who produced it with Nathan Chapman. According to Swift, the song is about an irresistible but dangerous love affair with strong connection and chemistry. Critics described it as an uptempo pop rock song. In Taste of Country, Amanda Hensel commented that "Sparks Fly" straddles the perceived boundary between country and pop. Ed Masley of The Arizona Republic called the song "a perfect blend of '70s arena rock and country". The production incorporates dynamic electric guitars and subtle fiddles.

In the lyrics, which feature fairy-tale imagery, the narrator talks about her obsession with a green-eyed boy, wanting to kiss him in the rain and waiting for him to lead her to private spaces. In the refrain, the narrator begs her love interest to "Drop everything now" and meet her in the pouring rain; Jonathan Keefe in Country Universe deemed this part the track's hook. The lyrics mentioning love under the rain recall many of Swift's previous songs from her second album Fearless (2008), including the title track, "Hey Stephen", and "Forever & Always".

The second verse of the 2010 album version replaces some lyrics in the original version such as, "Cause my heart is beating fast and you are beautiful," and includes new lyrics such as, "My mind forgets to remind me you're a bad idea." Chris Willman from Yahoo! Music commented that the new lyrics portray the narrator as more confident. Additionally, the album version leaves out the banjo on the original. According to Theon Weber of The Village Voice, the lyric, "Gimme something that'll haunt me when you're not around," is an allusion to sex.

Critical reception 
In a Speak Now album review for Rolling Stone, Rob Sheffield selected "Sparks Fly" as an example where Swift improved as a singer. Keefe was otherwise unimpressed with Swift's vocals, which he deemed technically weak and limited, but lauded the song for its production and simplicity. Though Keefe remarked that the lyrical imagery was generic, the song "proves how evocative those turns-of-phrase can be in the right context". In Country Universe, Keefe gave the track an A rating.

Bobby Peacock of Roughstock and Amanda Hensel of Taste of Country both gave "Sparks Fly" a three-and-a-half rating out of five. Peacock welcomed the lyrical revisions from the original version and said that although the refrain is catchy, the song begins to trail off by the second half. Hensel similarly commended the catchy production but felt that it lacked the originality of Speak Now previous single "Mean". On a more negative side, Erin Thompson of Seattle Weekly commented the rain imagery on "Sparks Fly" represented Swift's lack of repertoire in her songwriting. John J. Moser from The Morning Call and Mikael Wood from Spin considered it one of the album's weakest tracks.

In a retrospective review, NME Hannah Mylrea lauded the "euphoric" production and described the song as a "toe-tapping head-banging anthem". Sheffield picked it as an example where Swift "shows off her uncanny power to make a moment sound gauchely private and messily public at the same time". In Consequence, Mary Siroky opined that "Sparks Fly", which "fervidly showcased Swift's maturing approaches to songwriting and romance", should have been Speak Now lead single replacing the "safe and reflective" "Mine". Finley Liu, in a South China Morning Post ranking of Swift's discography, picked "Sparks Fly" as one of the album's underrated songs.

Accolades
At the BMI Country Awards in 2012, "Sparks Fly" was one of the 50 award-winning songs and helped Sony Music Publishing earn the award for Publisher of the Year. It received a nomination for Favorite Song at the 2012 Nickelodeon Kids' Choice Awards and won Choice Country Song at the 2012 Teen Choice Awards. In 2019, Insider named "Sparks Fly" one of the eighteen best songs written by teenagers.

Commercial performance 
After Speak Now was released, "Sparks Fly" debuted at number 17 (which also became its peak) on the US Billboard Hot 100 chart dated November 4, 2010. It was one of the ten Speak Now tracks that debuted on the Hot 100 the same week, making Swift the first act to have ten new Hot 100 entries at the same time. After its single release, it re-entered the Billboard Hot 100 at number 84 on the week ending August 27, 2011. "Sparks Fly" spent a total of 20 weeks on the Hot 100.

On Billboard Hot Country Songs chart, which monitored US country airplay, the song peaked at number one on the chart dated November 26, 2011; it spent 21 weeks in total on the chart. It was Swift's fifth Hot Country Songs number-one single and her first since "You Belong with Me" (2009). "Sparks Fly" ranked at number 37 on the 2011 Hot Country Songs year-end chart. The single was certified platinum by the Recording Industry Association of America (RIAA) for surpassing one million units and, as of November 2017, had sold 1.1 million digital copies in the United States.

In Canada, "Sparks Fly" debuted and peaked at number 28 on the Canadian Hot 100 and number three on the Canada Country chart. The single reached the lower-tier positions on charts in Australia (number 97) and Flanders (number 17 on the Ultratip chart).

Live performances 

Swift performed "Sparks Fly" as an unreleased song during a few live shows in 2007.
She performed "Sparks Fly" for an NBC Speak Now Thanksgiving Special, which broadcast on November 25, 2010. The television special showcased the making of the album along with live performances on a rooftop in New York City. On the Speak Now World Tour (2011–2012), Swift included it as the opening song to the concerts. She sang the song wearing a gold dress and tall black boots as fireworks dashed through a three-staircase stage. The performance was recorded and released on Swift's live album, Speak Now World Tour – Live (2011).

On January 11, 2011, Swift performed "Sparks Fly" as part of an exclusive concert for the Allure of the Seas cruise in Mexico. She later performed "Sparks Fly" at the 2011 CMA Music Festival, held in August, and at a showcase in Rio de Janeiro, Brazil, in September 2012, with Brazilian singer-songwriter Paula Fernandes. Swift later included the track on the set list of the Red Tour (2013–2014); during the shows, she sang the song on a platform suspended from the ceiling. The song was part of select shows for her later tours, the 1989 World Tour (Vancouver, August 2015), and Reputation Stadium Tour (Columbus, July 2018). She also performed the track at the Formula 1 Grand Prix held on October 22, 2016, in Austin.

Music video 
The music video for "Sparks Fly", directed by Christian Lamb, was released on August 10, 2011. It features footage from the Speak Now World Tour; much of the footage was captured at four tour date locations, including one from the show in Newark, New Jersey. Throughout the video, Swift is seen performing with many stage actors, dancers, and acrobats, through multiple costume changes, and slow motion is used extensively. Media publications praised the video's production quality with visually stimulating stage settings. During the week of its release, the music video accumulated over 400,000 views and helped Swift rise from number nineteen to ten on Billboard Social 50 chart.

Charts

Weekly charts

Year-end charts

Certifications

Release history

See also
 List of Hot Country Songs number ones of 2011

References 

2010 songs
2011 singles
Taylor Swift songs
Songs written by Taylor Swift
Song recordings produced by Nathan Chapman (record producer)
Big Machine Records singles
Song recordings produced by Taylor Swift
American pop rock songs